Folon is an album by the Malian artist Salif Keita. It was released in 1995 by Mango Records.

Production
The album was produced primarily by Wally Badarou. "Mandjou" is a remake of one of Keita's 1970s hits. "Seydou" is a tribute to Chris Seydou.

Critical reception

Rolling Stone wrote that "once he has filled the crossover quota ... Keita offers solemn, languid, march-tempo meditations ('Mandjou', 'Mandela', 'Nyanyama') that are hauntingly beautiful and deceptively sophisticated." The Guardian determined that "though more dancey in drum and bass than ever the albino activist's disenchantment with European life is evident, warmly expressed in an increasingly pan-African view."

AllMusic praised the "gritty voice that transcends classification," writing that Keita "spins dance tracks that reveal a dedication to tradition and passion."

Track listing
All songs written by Salif Keita.
 "Tekere" 6:33 (clap your hands)
 "Mandjou" 10:37
 "Africa" 5:59
 "Nyanyama" 6:18
 "Mandela" 4:30
 "Sumun" 6:57
 "Seydou" 5:48
 "Dakan-Fe" 5:06
 "Folon" 4:25

Personnel 
Salif Keita: Vocals
Angeline Annonier, Nayanka Bell, Djanka Diabate, Djene Doumbouya, Mora Birbeck, Bessy Gordon: Vocal Backing
Ousmane Kouyate: Guitars
Wally Badarou: Keyboards, Vocal Backing
Check Tidiane Seck: Keyboards
Mohktar Samba: Drums
Souleymane Doumbouya, Sydney Thiam: Percussion

References 

1995 albums
Salif Keita albums
Albums produced by Wally Badarou
Mango Records albums